Bayaz Rural District is a rural district (dehestan) in the Central District of Anar County, Kerman Province, Iran. At the 2006 census, its population was 8,325, in 2,026 families. The rural district has 23 villages.

References 

Rural Districts of Kerman Province
Anar County